The 2022 Georgia lieutenant gubernatorial election was held on November 8, 2022, to elect the lieutenant governor of the U.S. state of Georgia. It coincided with various other statewide elections, including for U.S. Senate, U.S. House, and Governor of Georgia. Georgia is one of 21 states that elects its lieutenant governor separately from its governor.

Incumbent Republican Lieutenant Governor Geoff Duncan, who was first elected in 2018 with 51.6% of the vote, declined to run for a second term after he openly contradicted claims of election fraud in the 2020 presidential election. A vocal critic of Donald Trump, he had been speculated as a potential presidential candidate in the 2024 election.

Primary elections were held on May 24, with runoffs being held on June 21 for instances in which no candidate received a majority of the initial vote. State legislator Burt Jones won the Republican nomination and was one of two Trump-endorsed statewide candidates in Georgia to do so, along with Herschel Walker in his run for U.S. Senate. Attorney Charlie Bailey won the Democratic primary in a runoff, and former party chair Ryan Graham was chosen as the Libertarian nominee.

Jones won a 5% victory over Bailey, which was by a wider margin than Duncan in 2018, and was declared the winner on November 9. Jones was inaugurated on January 9, 2023.

Republican primary

Candidates

Nominee 
 Burt Jones, state senator

Eliminated in primary 
 Mack McGregor, manufacturing supervisor
 Butch Miller, president pro tempore of the Georgia State Senate

Declined 
 Chris Clark, president and CEO of the Georgia Chamber of Commerce
 Geoff Duncan, incumbent lieutenant governor
 P. K. Martin IV, former state senator

Endorsements

Polling
Graphical summary

Results

Democratic primary

Candidates

Nominee 
Charlie Bailey, former Fulton County senior assistant district attorney and nominee for Georgia Attorney General in 2018

Eliminated in runoff 

Eliminated in initial primary 
 Erick Allen, state representative
 Tyrone Brooks Jr., manager
 Tony Brown, U.S. Air Force veteran
 Jason Hayes, doctor
 Derrick Jackson, state representative
 Rashid Malik, entrepreneur
 Renitta Shannon, state representative

Did not file 
 Ben Turner, entrepreneur, educator, and activist

Withdrawn
 Bryan Miller, grandson of former U.S. Senator Zell Miller

Declined 
 Keisha Lance Bottoms, former Mayor of Atlanta
 Sarah Riggs Amico, businesswoman, nominee for lieutenant governor in 2018, and candidate for U.S. Senate in 2020 (endorsed Allen)

Endorsements

First round

Polling

Results

Runoff

Results

Libertarian primary

Candidates

Nominee
Ryan Graham, chair of the Libertarian Party of Georgia and candidate for Georgia Public Service Commission in 2018

General election

Endorsements

Polling 
Graphical summary

Results

See also 
 2022 Georgia state elections

Notes 

Partisan sponsors

References

External links 
Official campaign sites
 Charlie Bailey (D) for Lieutenant Governor
 Ryan Graham (L) for Lieutenant Governor
 Burt Jones (R) for Lieutenant Governor

Lieutenant gubernatorial
Georgia
Georgia (U.S. state) lieutenant gubernatorial elections